The Church of Saint Panteleimon in Gorno Nerezi, North Macedonia, is a small 12th-century Byzantine church located in a monastery complex. The church and monastery are dedicated to St. Panteleimon, the patron saint of physicians. The church was constructed in 1164 as a foundation of Alexios Angelos, a son of Constantine Angelos.

The church has a domed cruciform core, three apses, and a rectangular narthex. It is built of irregular stone blocks and brick embedded in thick layers of mortar. The surrounding monastery complex is enclosed by walls.

The frescoes in the church are famous examples of Komnenian-era Byzantine art, depicting scenes from the Passion of Christ and various hagiographical illustrations. Similar compositions appear in the Latomou Monastery in Thessaloniki. The church was damaged by an earthquake in the 16th century. In the restoration that followed, some of the frescoes in the upper middle region have been repainted. The original marble iconostasis survived the earthquake, but lost its decorative plastic art.

In another restoration attempt in 1885, the larger part of the frescoes in the naos were painted over rather ineptly. During cleaning in 1923, some of the original 12th-century frescoes were restored.

The coloring, dramatic composition and purity of expression displayed in the frescoes are outstanding examples of Byzantine medieval monumental painting in the later 12th century.

The church's stucco decoration is depicted on the obverse of the Macedonian 50 denars banknote, issued in 1996.

Renaissance origins 

According to Andrew Graham-Dixon, British art historian and writer, these frescoes with their "...physical, electric presence..." are proof that there was more to Byzantine art than the formality and otherworldliness of its mosaic and icon tradition. In his book, Graham-Dixon questions 16th century Vasari's beliefs that Giotto di Bondone finally turned fresco painting away from the primitive influence of Byzantium. The frescoes contained within St. Panteleimon at Nerezi are not seen as static, they had the capacity to change into something more obviously human and realistic, anticipating the West's emphasis on depicting Christ as a man of flesh and blood by some 150 years. The lamentation of Christ fresco is described as being a fusion of life and death in a single image as Mary movingly mourns Jesus, cradling him between her legs. Graham-Dixon reminds that these frescoes from the 1160s precede Giotto's similar emotional frescoes from the Arena Chapel in Padua, circa 1305. He concludes "...the Byzantine east played a much more formative role in the development of renaissance art than Vasari was prepared to concede."

See also
History of Roman and Byzantine domes

References

 A. J. Wharton: "Nerezi". In: Oxford Dictionary of Byzantium, New York/Oxford, 1991.
 K. Dimče: "Nerezi". In: Enciklopedija Jugoslavije, 1st ed., Zagreb 1965.
 V. J. Djurić: "Nerezi". In: Lexikon des Mittelalters, Stuttgart/Weimar, 1999.
Matthias Bronisch, Oplakuvanjeto vo Sv.Pantelejmon - Nerezi. In: Kulturen Zivot, 74, 8-9, S.18-22

Books

 Petar Miljković-Pepek: Nerezi (Kunstdenkmäler in Jugoslawien). Jugoslavija, Beograd 1966.
 Ida Sinkević: The Church of St. Panteleimon at Nerezi: Architecture, programme, patronage. Reichert, Wiesbaden 2000, .
 Andrew Graham-Dixon: Renaissance. London: BBC, 1999. .

Buildings and structures in Skopje
Byzantine church buildings in North Macedonia
Eastern Orthodox church buildings in North Macedonia
12th-century Eastern Orthodox church buildings